eHostela is a television drama series in South Africa.

Cast

Starring 
 Thobani Nzuza as Mndeni
 Wiseman Mncube as Jama
 Lungelo Mpangase as Khethiwe
 Lindiwe Ndlovu as MaKhumalo
 Mabutho Sithole as Scelo Sikhosana
 Sthandwa Nzuza as Friendship
 Bheki Sibiya as Mancinza
 Noxolo Mathula as Fikile AKA Fiks
 Martin Ziqubu as Detective Nkomo
 Zola Nombona as Constable t Msibi as Vovo
 Bhekani Shabalala as Deacon Nkosi
  Mkhwanazi as Vuma
 Tiyani Baloyi as child 1
 Busa Xulu as Mtshali Child 1
 Smanga Mngeni as Mtshali Child 2
 Lucky Simayile as Vela
 Mlungisi Ndebele as Jackson
 Smanga Cibane as Uniformed Cop
 Nokuthula Mazibuko as Mam Mabaso
 Simphiwe Mkhize as Dumisani
 Lungile 'Coach' Nkombeo as MC
 Bheka Radebe as Njapha
 Bongani Mbatha as Bheki
 Bonginkosi Shangase as Brotherhood Council Member 1
 Nkosinathi Madlala as Brotherhood Council Member 2
 Sduduzo Mapumulo as Nhlakanipho
 Bruce Msani as Khandalimtshelokwakhe
 Andiswa Ndlovu as Friendship's Child 1
 Siyethaba Mhlongo as Friendship's Child 2
 Sjava as Friendship's Child 3
 Wanda Gumede as Sibongiseni

Episodes

Ratings

Accolades

References

South African drama television series